The Horti Agrippinae (Gardens of Agrippina) was a set of private gardens belonging to Agrippina the Elder on the west bank of the river Tiber in ancient Rome.

See also
Roman gardens

References

Bibliography
 http://penelope.uchicago.edu/Thayer/E/Gazetteer/Places/Europe/Italy/Lazio/Roma/Rome/_Texts/PLATOP*/horti.html

Agrippinae